Michał Szewczyk (born 17 October 1992 in Chorzów) is a Polish footballer who plays as a winger for Unia Oświęcim.

Club career
Szewczyk made his debut for Wisła Kraków in the Ekstraklasa on 31 August 2012 in a match against Polonia Warsaw.

He signed with Soła Oświęcim in August 2017, but left the club again at the end of 2018. On 24 January 2019, Szewczyk signed a 6-month contract with MKS Kluczbork.

References

External links
 
 

1992 births
Living people
Polish footballers
Poland under-21 international footballers
Wisła Kraków players
Ruch Chorzów players
MKS Kluczbork players
Ekstraklasa players
I liga players
III liga players
Sportspeople from Chorzów
Association football wingers